Por amor is a 1968 bolero by Rafael Solano a native from the Dominican Republic. The song was first and most famously sung by Niní Cáffaro, and has been covered by Lucho Gatica, Marco Antonio Muñiz, Vicki Carr, Jon Secada,  Gloria Estefan and Plácido Domingo.

The lyrics commence:
"Por amor, se han creado los hombres, en la faz de la tierra, por amor, hay quien haya querido, regalar una estrella,.."

References

1968 songs
Boleros